Luis Germán Cajiga is Puerto Rican painter, poet and essayist known for his screen printing depicting Puerto Rico's natural landscape, its creole culture, and religious motifs.  He was born in 1934, in the municipality of Quebradillas, Puerto Rico, and his studio is currently based in the Old San Juan.

Early life
Cajiga was born in the barrio of Cacao in Quebradillas, Puerto Rico. When he was a young man he moved to San Juan, where he studied graphic art. In 1955 he became a Seventh-day Adventist. While in the military he served in the Canal Zone in Panama, as a medic. In 1975 he got a master of arts degree in counseling and guidance at Interamerican University of Puerto Rico.

Art work

Early work
He began his artistic education in the studio of the “División de Educación de la Comunidad en San Juan” (San Juan's Community Education Division).  There, under the tutelage of Fran Cervoni, Cajiga furthered his interest for Old San Juan, a subject that to this day permeates his art.

Cajiga dedicated a great deal of his time on serigraphic work (silk-screening).  During the early years, he prepared and printed the works of Homar and Tufiño. These in return provided him with support and instruction.  He continued to perfect the technique, which remains a significant part of his current work.  His first two oil paintings may be found in the palace of Santa Catalina and at the Museo de Arte de Ponce.  "Calle Mercado" one of the two aforementioned oils was acquired by Governor Luis A. Ferré.  Among his exhibiting venues in Puerto Rico are: Ateneo Puertorriqueño, Instituto de Cultura Puertorriqueña (Institute of Puerto Rican Culture), Museo de la Universidad de Puerto Rico, Pontificia Universidad Católica de Puerto Rico, Universidad Interamericana, Museo de Arte de Ponce, various educational and cultural centers in the island, and commercial galleries. Many of his paintings, especially posters, were printed by the artist from Adjuntas, Puerto Rico Don Samuel Maldonado Plaza in the 1980s. The printing was done in the silkscreen shop of Don Gildo Rivera Santiago in Ponce, Puerto Rico.

Doris M. Vázquez, from the Yale-New Haven Teachers Institute considered him one of the most “outstanding artists of the fifties”.  As a witness to that we find his artwork in the following collections:

Museum of History, Anthropology, and Art, University of Puerto Rico, Río Piedras Campus, San Juan, Puerto Rico
The Governor's Mansion: La Fortaleza, San Juan, Puerto Rico
Instituto de Cultura Puertorriqueña, San Juan, Puerto Rico
Museo de Arte de Ponce, Ponce, Puerto Rico
Ateneo Puertorriqueño, San Juan, Puerto Rico
Museum of Art of Puerto Rico, San Juan, Puerto Rico

Later work

He produced a poster for the United States Hispanic Heritage Month in 1997, and a mural in New York for the Heineken Mural Art Series in 2002.

Poetry and other writings

Cajiga has published five poetry books as well as novels and short stories.  Of notable mention is the book “Génesis: Décimas” a poetic transcription of the Book of Genesis published by the Institute of Puerto Rican Culture.  He has also published various works of a religious nature as well as vegetarian recipe books. He hasn't died yet.

Cajiga has been featured in various publications.

Catalogues:
Babín, María Teresa. Programa de la Cultura Puertorriqueña.
"Fuego Divino", Libro de Poemas Ilustrados.
"Pintores Puertorriqueños Contemporáneos", San Juan, Puerto Rico.
"Portafolio", Instituto de Cultura Puertorriqueña, San Juan, Puerto Rico, 1958.
"Pintores Puertorriqueños", Portafolio Museo de Arte de Ponce, Ponce, Puerto Rico
Magazines/Journals:
Boletín Academia de Artes y Ciencia, núm. 2,Tomo IV,  1969.
Newspaper Articles:
Periódico El Mundo, Suplemento Dominical, (San Juan, PR), 11 de julio de 1971.
Periódico El Nuevo Día, (San Juan, PR), 28 de agosto de 1976.
Periódico El Mundo, (San Juan, PR), 27 de marzo de 1974.
Periódico El Mundo,(San Juan, PR), 26 de septiembre de 1976.
Periódico El Mundo, (San Juan, PR), 18 de enero de 1976.
Periódico La Hora, 27 de septiembre de 1973. The San Juan Star, (San Juan, PR), 19 de enero de 1975.
Periódico El Mundo, (San Juan, PR), 4 de octubre de 1973.
Periódico El Mundo, (San Juan, PR), 14 de enero de 1975.

Awards, decorations, and recognitions

1957- Puerto Rico Fire Department Contest - 2nd Place
1965- IBEC, Caguas, Puerto Rico - 1st Place
1969- San Juan Town Hall Contest - 2nd Place
1972- Sterling House, Christmas Plate Design Contest
High Council of Art- Agüeybana de Oro
Libre Empresa Award
Support from UNESCO-Puerto Rico has brought his artwork to Latin America and the European Union.

See also
List of Puerto Ricans

References

External links
Estudio Cajiga
Chat with beloved Puerto Rican painter (Spanish)
‘‘Publications by the Institute of Puerto Rican Culture''
An outstanding artist along the lines of Homar and Tufiño
Cajiga at Fundacion Luis Muñoz Marín
Cajiga paints the Coat of Arms of his hometown, Quebradillas
Cajiga the first lithographer on tin in Puerto Rico

1934 births
Interamerican University of Puerto Rico alumni
Living people
People from Quebradillas, Puerto Rico
Puerto Rican painters
Puerto Rican Seventh-day Adventists
Converts to Adventism